Jean Georges Cosmat (3 July 1910 – 29 March 2010) was a French rower who competed in the 1936 Summer Olympics.

In 1936 he won the bronze medal as crew member of the French boat in the coxed four competition.

References

External links
 Jean Marcel Cosmat receives the French National Order of Merit in May 2008 
 Notice of Jean Marcel Cosmat's death 

1910 births
2010 deaths
French male rowers
Olympic rowers of France
Rowers at the 1936 Summer Olympics
Olympic bronze medalists for France
Olympic medalists in rowing
Officers of the Ordre national du Mérite
Medalists at the 1936 Summer Olympics
European Rowing Championships medalists
20th-century French people